Araucaria columnaris, the coral reef araucaria, Cook pine (or Cook's pine), New Caledonia pine, Cook araucaria, or columnar araucaria, is a species of conifer in the family Araucariaceae.

Distribution
The tree is endemic to New Caledonia in the Melanesia region of the Pacific.

It was first classified by Johann Reinhold Forster, a botanist on the second voyage of Captain James Cook to circumnavigate the globe as far south as possible. It is named directly for Cook, and not for the
Cook Islands.

Description
The trees have a slender, spire-like crown.
The shape of young trees strongly resembles A. heterophylla.
The bark of the Cook pine peels off in thin paper-like sheets or strips and is rough, grey, and resinous.

The relatively short, mostly horizontal branches are in whorls around the slender, upright to slightly leaning trunk. The branches are lined with cord-like, horizontal branchlets. The branchlets are covered with small, green, incurved, point-tipped, spirally arranged, overlapping leaves. The young leaves are needle-like, while the broader adult leaves are triangular and scale-like.

A 2017 study found that trees tend to have a tilt dependent on the hemisphere of their location, growing upright on the Equator but leaning south in the northern hemisphere and north in the southern hemisphere.

Ornamental tree
It is cultivated in gardens and public landscapes in Queensland and Victoria of Australia, northern New Zealand, Southern California, Puerto Rico, Mexico, India, Philippines and Hawaii. Many of the "Norfolk Island pines" that grow in Hawaii, including their descendants used as potted ornamentals on the U.S. mainland, are actually A. columnaris, the two species having been confused when introduced.

References

External links

Endemia.NewCaledonia — Araucaria columnaris — distribution maps & text info.
Conifers.org: Araucaria columnaris (coral reef araucaria) —  description & images.
Foster Garden (Honolulu, Hawai'i) — Araucaria columnaris image.
University of Murcia.es: World Plants virtual gallery photos of Araucaria columnaris

columnaris
Endemic flora of New Caledonia
Trees of New Caledonia
Least concern flora of Oceania
Taxa named by Johann Reinhold Forster
Taxa named by William Jackson Hooker
Garden plants of Oceania
Ornamental trees
Taxonomy articles created by Polbot